Provo Haitian Stars FC is a football club of the Turks and Caicos Islands. The team last played in the Turks and Caicos first division, the MFL League, in the 2006–07 season.

References

Football clubs in the Turks and Caicos Islands